Mukhor-Tarkhata (Mukur-Tarhatı) is a rural locality (a selo) in Mukhor-Tarkhatinskoye Rural Settlement of Kosh-Agachsky District, the Altai Republic, Russia. The population was 807 as of 2016. There are 9 streets.

Geography 
Mukhor-Tarkhata is located at the confluence of the Kok-Ozek River in Choi, 13 km west of Kosh-Agach (the district's administrative centre) by road. Kosh-Agach is the nearest rural locality.

References 

Rural localities in Kosh-Agachsky District